Live Magnetic Air is a live album by Canadian rock band Max Webster. It was recorded on 13 September 1979 at the Lyric Theatre in Kitchener and 14 September 1979 at War Memorial Hall in Guelph, with two shows played at each venue each night. The album was released on 22 October 1979 in Canada by Anthem Records and has been certified gold by the Canadian Recording Industry Association. 

The album was released in the United States on Capitol Records. In the United Kingdom a rare alternative to this release was made available. Seeing as Max Webster had two prior releases in the UK, Capitol-EMI released Magnetic Air, which allowed new fans to hear some of the live portions of the North American released Live Magnetic Air, as well as selections from the first two Max Webster releases Max Webster and High Class in Borrowed Shoes.

Track listing 
All songs by Kim Mitchell, Pye Dubois, except where indicated:
Side one
 "America's Veins" – 4:09
 "Paradise Skies" – 3:35
 "In Context of the Moon" – 5:21
 "Night Flights" (Terry Watkinson, Dubois) – 3:20
 "Lip Service" – 4:15
 "Sarniatown Reggae" – 1:15

Side two
 "Here Among the Cats" – 3:48
 "Gravity" – 4:48
 "Waterline" – 4:30
 "Charmonium" (Watkinson) – 4:38
 "Hangover" – 5:41

Personnel
Max Webster
Kim Mitchell – guitars and vocals
Terry Watkinson – keyboards and vocals, lead vocals on "Charmonium"
Dave Myles – bass guitar
Gary McCracken – drums and percussion
Pye Dubois – lyrics

Production
Terry Brown – producer, engineer, mixing
Mike McCarthy, Roger Hrycyna – mixing assistant
Hugh Syme – album design
Tom Berry – executive producer

References

Max Webster albums
1979 live albums
Anthem Records live albums
Albums produced by Terry Brown (record producer)
Capitol Records live albums